

Events

Pre-1600
 537 – The second Hagia Sophia in Constantinople is consecrated.
1512 – The Spanish Crown issues the Laws of Burgos, governing the conduct of settlers with regard to native Indians in the New World.
1521 – The Zwickau prophets arrive in Wittenberg, disturbing the peace and preaching the Apocalypse.

1601–1900
1655 – Second Northern War/the Deluge: Monks at the Jasna Góra Monastery in Częstochowa are successful in fending off a month-long siege.
1657 – The Flushing Remonstrance articulates for the first time in North American history that freedom of religion is a fundamental right.
1703 – Portugal and England sign the Methuen Treaty which allows Portugal to export wines to England on favorable trade terms.
1814 – War of 1812: The destruction of the schooner  brings to an end Commodore Daniel Patterson's makeshift fleet, which fought a series of delaying actions that contributed to Andrew Jackson's victory at the Battle of New Orleans.
1831 – Charles Darwin embarks on his journey aboard , during which he will begin to formulate his theory of evolution.
1836 – The worst ever avalanche in England occurs at Lewes, Sussex, killing eight people.
1845 – Ether anesthetic is used for childbirth for the first time by Dr. Crawford Long in Jefferson, Georgia.
  1845   – Having coined the phrase "manifest destiny" the previous July, journalist John L. O'Sullivan argued in his newspaper New York Morning News that the United States had the right to claim the entire Oregon Country.

1901–present
1911 – "Jana Gana Mana", the national anthem of India, is first sung in the Calcutta Session of the Indian National Congress.
1918 – The Great Poland Uprising against the Germans begins.
  1918   – Ukrainian War of Independence: The Revolutionary Insurgent Army of Ukraine occupies Yekaterinoslav and seizes seven airplanes from the UPRAF, establishing an Insurgent Air Fleet.
1922 –  becomes the first purpose built aircraft carrier to be commissioned in the world.
1927 – Kern and Hammerstein's musical play Show Boat, considered to be the first true American musical play, opens at the Ziegfeld Theatre on Broadway.
1929 – Soviet General Secretary Joseph Stalin orders the "liquidation of the kulaks as a class".
1932 – Radio City Music Hall, "Showplace of the Nation", opens in New York City.
1935 – Regina Jonas is ordained as the first female rabbi in the history of Judaism.
1939 – The 7.8  Erzincan earthquake shakes eastern Turkey with a maximum Mercalli intensity of XI (Extreme). At least 32,700 people were killed.
  1939   – Winter War: Finland holds off a Soviet attack in the Battle of Kelja.
1945 – The International Monetary Fund is created with the signing of an agreement by 29 nations.
1949 – Indonesian National Revolution: The Netherlands officially recognizes Indonesian independence. End of the Dutch East Indies.
1966 – The Cave of Swallows, the largest known cave shaft in the world, is discovered in Aquismón, San Luis Potosí, Mexico.
1968 – Apollo program: Apollo 8 splashes down in the Pacific Ocean, ending the first orbital crewed mission to the Moon.
1978 – Spain becomes a democracy after 40 years of fascist dictatorship.
1983 – Pope John Paul II visits Mehmet Ali Ağca in Rebibbia's prison and personally forgives him for the 1981 attack on him in St. Peter's Square.
1985 – Palestinian guerrillas kill eighteen people inside the airports of Rome, Italy, and Vienna, Austria.
1989 – The Romanian Revolution concludes, as the last minor street confrontations and stray shootings abruptly end in the country's capital, Bucharest. 
1991 – Scandinavian Airlines System Flight 751 crashes in Gottröra in the Norrtälje Municipality in Sweden, injuring 25. 
1996 – Taliban forces retake the strategic Bagram Airfield which solidifies their buffer zone around Kabul, Afghanistan.
1997 – Protestant paramilitary leader Billy Wright is assassinated in Northern Ireland, United Kingdom.
2002 – Two truck bombs kill 72 and wound 200 at the pro-Moscow headquarters of the Chechen government in Grozny, Chechnya, Russia.
2004 – Radiation from an explosion on the magnetar SGR 1806-20 reaches Earth. It is the brightest extrasolar event known to have been witnessed on the planet.
2007 – Former Pakistani prime minister Benazir Bhutto is assassinated in a shooting incident.
  2007   – Riots erupt in Mombasa, Kenya, after Mwai Kibaki is declared the winner of the presidential election, triggering a political, economic, and humanitarian crisis.
2008 – Operation Cast Lead: Israel launches three-week operation on Gaza.
2009 – Iranian election protests: On the Day of Ashura in Tehran, Iran, government security forces fire upon demonstrators.
2019 – Bek Air Flight 2100 crashes during takeoff from Almaty International Airport in Almaty, Kazakhstan, killing 13.

Births

Pre-1600
1350 – John I of Aragon (d. 1395)
1390 – Anne de Mortimer, claimant to the English throne (d. 1411)
1459 – John I Albert, King of Poland (d. 1501)
1481 – Casimir, Margrave of Brandenburg-Bayreuth, Margrave of Bayreuth (d. 1527)
1493 – Johann Pfeffinger, German theologian (d. 1573)
1566 – Jan Jesenius, Bohemian physician, politician and philosopher (d. 1621)
1571 – Johannes Kepler, German mathematician, astronomer, and astrologer (d. 1630)
1572 – Johannes Vodnianus Campanus, Czech poet, playwright, and composer (d. 1622)
1584 – Philipp Julius, Duke of Pomerania (d. 1625)
1595 – Bohdan Khmelnytsky, hetman of Ukraine (d. 1657)

1601–1900
1683 – Conyers Middleton, English priest and theologian (d. 1750)
1714 – George Whitefield, English preacher and saint (d. 1770)
1715 – Philippe de Noailles, French general (d. 1794)
1721 – François Hemsterhuis, Dutch philosopher and author (d. 1790)
1761 – Michael Andreas Barclay de Tolly, Russian field marshal and politician, Governor-General of Finland (d. 1818)
1773 – George Cayley, English engineer and politician (d. 1857)
1776 – Nikolay Kamensky, Russian general (d. 1811)
1797 – Ghalib, Indian poet (d. 1869)
  1797   – Charles Hodge, American theologian (d. 1878)
1803 – François-Marie-Thomas Chevalier de Lorimier, Canadian activist (d. 1839)
1809 – Alexandros Rizos Rangavis, Greek poet and politician, Foreign Minister of Greece (d. 1892)
1822 – Louis Pasteur, French chemist and microbiologist (d. 1895)
1823 – Mackenzie Bowell, English-Canadian journalist and politician, 5th Prime Minister of Canada (d. 1917)
1827 – Stanisław Mieroszewski, Polish-born politician, writer, historian and member of the Imperial Council of Austria (d. 1900)
1832 – Pavel Tretyakov, Russian businessman and philanthropist, founded the Tretyakov Gallery (d. 1897)
1858 – Juan Luis Sanfuentes, Chilean lawyer and politician, 17th President of Chile (d. 1930)
1863 – Louis Lincoln Emmerson, American lawyer and politician, 27th Governor of Illinois (d. 1941)
1864 – Hermann-Paul, French painter and illustrator (d. 1940)
1879 – Sydney Greenstreet, English-American actor (d. 1954)
1883 – Cyrus S. Eaton, Canadian-American businessman and philanthropist (d. 1979)
1888 – Thea von Harbou, German actress, director, and screenwriter (d. 1954)
1892 – Alfred Edwin McKay, Canadian captain and pilot (d. 1917)
1896 – Louis Bromfield, American author and theorist (d. 1956)
  1896   – Maurice De Waele, Belgian cyclist (d. 1952)
  1896   – Carl Zuckmayer, German author and playwright (d. 1977)
1898 – Inejiro Asanuma, Japanese politician (d. 1960)
1900 – Hans Stuck, German race car driver (d. 1978)

1901–present
1901 – Marlene Dietrich, German-American actress and singer (d. 1992)
  1901   – Irene Handl, English actress (d. 1987)
1904 – René Bonnet, French race car driver and engineer (d. 1983)
1905 – Cliff Arquette, American actor and comedian (d. 1974)
1906 – Oscar Levant, American pianist, composer, and actor (d. 1972)
1907 – Asaf Halet Çelebi, Turkish poet (d. 1958)
  1907   – Sebastian Haffner, German journalist and author (d. 1999)
  1907   – Mary Howard, English author (d. 1991)
  1907   – Conrad L. Raiford, American baseball player and activist (d. 2002)
  1907   – Willem van Otterloo, Dutch conductor and composer (d. 1978)
1909 – James Riddell, English skier and author (d. 2000)
1910 – Charles Olson, American poet and educator (d. 1970)
1911 – Anna Russell, English-Canadian singer and actress (d. 2006)
1915 – William Masters, American gynecologist, author, and academic (d. 2001)
  1915   – Gyula Zsengellér, Hungarian-Cypriot footballer and manager (d. 1999)
1916 – Werner Baumbach, German pilot (d. 1953)
  1916   – Cathy Lewis, American actress (d. 1968)
  1916   – William Garnett, American landscape photographer (d. 2006)
1917 – Buddy Boudreaux, American saxophonist and clarinet player (d. 2015)
  1917   – T. Nadaraja, Sri Lankan lawyer and academic (d. 2004)
  1917   – Onni Palaste, Finnish soldier and author (d. 2009)
1918 – John Celardo, American captain and illustrator (d. 2012)
1919 – Charles Sweeney, American general and pilot (d. 2004)
1920 – Bruce Hobbs, American jockey and trainer (d. 2005)
1921 – John Whitworth, English countertenor (d. 2013)
1923 – Bruno Bobak, Polish-Canadian painter and educator (d. 2012)
  1923   – Lucas Mangope, South African politician (d. 2018)
1924 – Jean Bartik, American computer scientist and engineer (d. 2011)
  1924   – James A. McClure, American soldier, lawyer, and politician (d. 2011)
1925 – Michel Piccoli, French actor, singer, director, and producer (d. 2020)
1926 – Jerome Courtland, American actor, director, and producer (d. 2012)
1927 – Antony Gardner, English engineer and politician (d. 2011)
  1927   – Nityanand Swami, Indian lawyer and politician, 1st Chief Minister of Uttarakhand (d. 2012)
  1927   – Audrey Wagner, American baseball player, obstetrician, and gynecologist (d. 1984)
1930 – Marshall Sahlins, American anthropologist and academic (d. 2021)
  1930   – Wilfrid Sheed, English-born American novelist and essayist (d. 2011)
1931 – Scotty Moore, American guitarist and songwriter (d. 2016)
1933 – Dave Marr, American golfer (d. 1997)
1934 – Larisa Latynina, Ukrainian gymnast and coach
  1934   – Jeffrey Sterling, Baron Sterling of Plaistow, English businessman
1935 – Michael Turnbull, English bishop
1936 – Phil Sharpe, English cricketer (d. 2014)
  1936   – Eve Uusmees, Estonian swimmer and coach
1939 – John Amos, American actor 
1940 – David Shepherd, English cricketer and umpire (d. 2009)
1941 – Miles Aiken, American basketball player and coach
  1941   – Mike Pinder, English singer-songwriter and keyboard player 
  1941   – Nolan Richardson, American basketball player and coach
1942 – Byron Browne, American baseball player
  1942   – Thomas Menino, American politician, 53rd Mayor of Boston (d. 2014)
  1942   – Ron Rothstein, American basketball player and coach
1943 – Cokie Roberts, American journalist and author (d. 2019)
  1943   – Joan Manuel Serrat, Spanish singer-songwriter and guitarist
  1943   – Peter Sinfield, English songwriter and producer
  1943   – Roy White, American baseball player and coach
1944 – Mick Jones, English guitarist, songwriter, and producer
1946 – Lenny Kaye, American guitarist, songwriter, and producer
  1946   – Joe Kinnear, Irish footballer and manager
  1946   – Janet Street-Porter, English journalist and producer
  1946   – Polly Toynbee, English journalist and author
1947 – Bill Eadie, American wrestler and coach
  1947   – Doug Livermore, English footballer and manager
  1947   – Osman Pamukoğlu, Turkish general and politician
  1947   – Willy Polleunis, Belgian runner
1948 – Gérard Depardieu, French-Russian actor
1949 – Terry Ito, Japanese director, producer, and critic
1950 – Haris Alexiou, Greek singer-songwriter
  1950   – Roberto Bettega, Italian footballer and manager
  1950   – Terry Bozzio, American drummer and songwriter 
1951 – Ernesto Zedillo, Mexican economist and politician, 54th President of Mexico
1952 – Tovah Feldshuh, American actress, singer, and playwright
  1952   – Jay Hill, Canadian farmer and politician
  1952   – David Knopfler, Scottish singer-songwriter, guitarist, and producer 
1954 – Edmund Zagorski, American convicted murderer (d. 2018)
  1954   – Mandie Fletcher, English director, producer, and production manager
  1954   – Teo Chee Hean, Singaporean politician and 5th Senior Minister of Singapore
1955 – Brad Murphey, American race car driver
  1955   – Barbara Olson, American journalist and author (d. 2001)
1956 – Doina Melinte, Romanian runner
1958 – Steve Jones, American golfer
1959 – Gerina Dunwich, American astrologer, historian, and author
  1959   – Andre Tippett, American football player and coach
1960 – Maryam d'Abo, English actress 
  1960   – Donald Nally, American conductor and academic
  1960   – Terry Price, Australian golfer 
1961 – Guido Westerwelle, German lawyer and politician, 15th Vice-Chancellor of Germany (d. 2016)
1962 – Mark Few, American basketball player and coach
  1962   – John Kampfner, Singaporean journalist and author
  1962   – Bill Self, American basketball player and coach
  1962   – Sherri Steinhauer, American golfer
1963 – Gaspar Noé, Argentinian-French director and screenwriter
1965 – Chris Mainwaring, Australian footballer and journalist (d. 2007)
  1965   – Salman Khan, Indian film actor and producer
1966 – Marianne Elliott, English director and producer
  1966   – Bill Goldberg, American football player, wrestler and actor
  1966   – Eva LaRue, American model and actress
  1966   – Fabian Núñez, American politician
1969 – Jean-Christophe Boullion, French race car driver
  1969   – Sarah Vowell, American author and journalist
  1969   – Chyna, American professional wrestler and actress (d. 2016)
1970 – Brendon Cook, Australian race car driver and rugby player
  1970   – Lorenzo Neal, American football player and radio host
  1970   – Naoko Yamazaki, Japanese pilot and astronaut
1971 – Duncan Ferguson, Scottish footballer and coach
  1971   – Guthrie Govan, English guitarist and educator 
  1971   – Savannah Guthrie, American television journalist
  1971   – Jason Hawes, American paranormal investigator and author, founded The Atlantic Paranormal Society
  1971   – Bryan Smolinski, American ice hockey player and coach
1972 – Colin Charvis, Welsh rugby union player and coach
  1972   – Kevin Ollie, American basketball player and coach
  1972   – Matt Slocum, American guitarist and songwriter 
1973 – Kristoffer Zegers, Dutch pianist and composer
1974 – Tomáš Janků, Czech high jumper
  1974   – Masi Oka, Japanese-American actor and visual effects designer
  1974   – Fumiko Orikasa, Japanese voice actress and singer
  1974   – Jay Pandolfo, American ice hockey player and coach
1975 – Aigars Fadejevs, Latvian race walker and therapist
  1975   – Kjell Eriksson, Swedish television personality
  1975   – Heather O'Rourke, American actress (d. 1988)
1976 – Nikolaos Georgeas, Greek footballer
  1976   – Piotr Morawski, Polish mountaineer (d. 2009)
  1976   – Daimí Pernía, Cuban basketball player and hurdler
  1976   – Fernando Pisani, Canadian-Italian ice hockey player
1977 – Jacqueline Pillon, Canadian actress 
  1977   – Chris Tate, English footballer
1978 – Deuce McAllister, American football player
1979 – Pascale Dorcelus, Canadian weightlifter
  1979   – David Dunn, English footballer and manager
  1979   – Carson Palmer, American football player
1980 – Bernard Berrian, American football player
  1980   – Cesaro, Swiss professional wrestler
  1980   – Dahntay Jones, American basketball player
  1980   – Meelis Kompus, Estonian journalist
1981 – David Aardsma, American baseball player
  1981   – Emilie de Ravin, Australian actress
  1981   – Moise Joseph, American-Haitian runner
  1981   – Patrick Sharp, Canadian ice hockey player
1982 – Erin E. Stead, American illustrator
1983 – Anthony Boric, New Zealand rugby union player
  1983   – Cole Hamels, American baseball player
  1983   – Jesse Williams, American high jumper
1984 – Andrejs Perepļotkins, Ukrainian-Latvian footballer
  1984   – Gilles Simon, French tennis player
1985 – Logan Bailly, Belgian footballer
  1985   – Jérôme d'Ambrosio, Belgian race car driver
  1985   – Paul Stastny, Canadian-American ice hockey player
  1985   – Halley Gross, American screenwriter
1986 – Torah Bright, Australian snowboarder
  1986   – Shelly-Ann Fraser-Pryce, Jamaican sprinter
1987 – Tim Browne, Australian rugby league player
  1987   – Lily Cole, English model
1988 – Hera Hilmar, Icelandic actress
  1988   – Zavon Hines, Jamaican-English footballer
  1988   – Ok Taec-yeon, South Korean singer and actor
  1988   – Rick Porcello, American baseball player
  1988   – Hayley Williams, American singer-songwriter
1989 – Ingrid Várgas Calvo, Peruvian tennis player
1990 – Max Lindholm, Finnish figure skater
  1990   – Jon Marchessault, Canadian ice hockey player
  1990   – Milos Raonic, Canadian tennis player
1991 – Michael Morgan, Australian rugby league player
  1991   – Danny Wilson, Scottish footballer
1992 – Joel Indermitte, Estonian footballer
  1992   – Maicel Uibo, Estonian decathlete
1993 – Olivia Cooke, English actress
1995 – Timothée Chalamet, American actor
  1995   – Nick Chubb, American football player
  1995   – Mark Lapidus, Estonian chess player
1997 – Vachirawit Chiva-aree, Thai actor and singer
  1997   – Ana Konjuh, Croatian tennis player

Deaths

Pre-1600
 683 – Gaozong of Tang, founding emperor of the Chinese Tang dynasty (b. 628)
 870 – Aeneas of Paris, Frankish bishop
 975 – Balderic, bishop of Utrecht (b. 897)
1003 – Emma of Blois, French duchess and regent
1005 – Nilus the Younger, Byzantine abbot (b. 910)
1076 – Sviatoslav II, Grand Prince of Kiev (b. 1027)
1087 – Bertha of Savoy, Holy Roman Empress (b. 1051)
1381 – Edmund Mortimer, 3rd Earl of March, English politician (b. 1352)
1518 – Mahmood Shah Bahmani II, sultan of the Bahmani Sultanate (b. c. 1470)
1543 – George, margrave of Brandenburg-Ansbach (b. 1484)
1548 – Francesco Spiera, Italian lawyer and jurist (b. 1502)

1601–1900
1603 – Thomas Cartwright, English minister and theologian (b. 1535)
1656 – Andrew White, English Jesuit missionary (b. 1579)
1704 – Hans Albrecht von Barfus, Prussian field marshal and politician (b. 1635)
1707 – Jean Mabillon, French monk and scholar (b. 1632)
1737 – William Bowyer, English printer (b. 1663)
1743 – Hyacinthe Rigaud, French painter (b. 1659)
1771 – Henri Pitot, French engineer, invented the Pitot tube (b. 1695)
1776 – Johann Rall, Hessian colonel (b. )
1782 – Henry Home, Lord Kames, Scottish judge and philosopher (b. 1697)
1800 – Hugh Blair, Scottish minister and author (b. 1718)
1812 – Joanna Southcott, English religious leader (b. 1750)
1834 – Charles Lamb, English essayist and poet (b. 1775)
1836 – Stephen F. Austin, American soldier and politician (b. 1793)
1858 – Alexandre Pierre François Boëly, French pianist and composer (b. 1785)
1896 – John Brown, English businessman and politician (b. 1816)
1900 – William Armstrong, 1st Baron Armstrong, English engineer and businessman, founded Armstrong Whitworth (b. 1810)

1901–present
1914 – Charles Martin Hall, American chemist and engineer (b. 1863)
1919 – Achilles Alferaki, Russian-Greek composer and politician, Governor of Taganrog (b. 1846)
1923 – Gustave Eiffel, French architect and engineer, co-designed the Eiffel Tower (b. 1832)
1924 – Agda Meyerson, Swedish nurse and healthcare activist (b. 1866)
1936 – Mehmet Akif Ersoy, Turkish poet, academic, and politician (b. 1873)
1938 – Calvin Bridges, American geneticist and academic (b. 1889)
  1938   – Osip Mandelstam, Polish-Russian poet and critic (b. 1891)
  1938   – Zona Gale, American novelist, short story writer, and playwright (b. 1874)
1939 – Rinaldo Cuneo, American painter (b. 1877)
1943 – Ants Kurvits, Estonian general and politician, 10th Estonian Minister of War (b. 1887)
1950 – Max Beckmann, German-American painter and sculptor (b. 1884)
1952 – Patrick Joseph Hartigan, Australian priest, author, and educator (b. 1878)
1953 – Şükrü Saracoğlu, Turkish soldier and politician, 6th Prime Minister of Turkey (b. 1887)
  1953   – Julian Tuwim, Polish poet and author (b. 1894)
1955 – Alfred Carpenter, English admiral, Victoria Cross recipient (b. 1881)
1956 – Lambert McKenna, Irish priest and lexicographer (b. 1870)
1965 – Edgar Ende, German painter (b. 1901)
1972 – Lester B. Pearson, Canadian historian and politician, 14th Prime Minister of Canada, Nobel Prize laureate (b. 1897)
1974 – Vladimir Fock, Russian physicist and mathematician (b. 1898)
  1974   – Amy Vanderbilt, American author (b. 1908)
1978 – Chris Bell, American singer-songwriter and guitarist (b. 1951)
  1978   – Houari Boumediene, Algerian colonel and politician, 2nd President of Algeria (b. 1932)
  1978   – Bob Luman, American singer-songwriter and guitarist (b. 1937)
1979 – Hafizullah Amin, Afghan educator and politician, 2nd General Secretary of the People's Democratic Party of Afghanistan (b. 1929)
1981 – Hoagy Carmichael, American singer-songwriter, pianist, and actor (b. 1899)
1982 – Jack Swigert, American pilot, astronaut, and politician (b. 1931)
1985 – Jean Rondeau, French race car driver (b. 1946)
1986 – George Dangerfield, English-American historian and journalist (b. 1904)
  1986   – Dumas Malone, American historian and author (b. 1892)
1987 – Rewi Alley, New Zealand writer and political activist (b. 1897)
1988 – Hal Ashby, American director and producer (b. 1929)
1992 – Kay Boyle, American novelist, poet, and educator (b. 1902)
1993 – Feliks Kibbermann, Estonian chess player and philologist (b. 1902)
  1993   – Evald Mikson, Estonian footballer (b. 1911)
  1993   – André Pilette, Belgian race car driver (b. 1918)
1994 – Fanny Cradock, English author and critic (b. 1909)
  1994   – J. B. L. Reyes, Filipino lawyer and jurist (b. 1902)
1995 – Shura Cherkassky, Ukrainian-American pianist (b. 1909)
  1995   – Genrikh Kasparyan, Armenian chess player and composer (b. 1910)
1997 – Brendan Gill, American journalist and essayist (b. 1914)
  1997   – Billy Wright, Northern Irish loyalist leader (b. 1960)
1999 – Michael McDowell, American author and screenwriter (b. 1950)
2002 – George Roy Hill, American actor, director, producer, and screenwriter (b. 1921)
2003 – Alan Bates, English actor (b. 1934)
  2003   – Iván Calderón, Puerto Rican-American baseball player (b. 1962)
2004 – Hank Garland, American guitarist (b. 1930)
2007 – Benazir Bhutto, Pakistani politician, Prime Minister of Pakistan (b. 1953)
  2007   – Jerzy Kawalerowicz, Polish director and screenwriter (b. 1922)
  2007   – Jaan Kross, Estonian author and poet (b. 1920)
2008 – Delaney Bramlett, American singer-songwriter, guitarist, and producer (b. 1939)
  2008   – Robert Graham, Mexican-American sculptor (b. 1938)  
2009 – Isaac Schwartz,  Ukrainian-Russian composer and educator (b. 1923) 
2011 – Catê, Brazilian footballer and manager (b. 1973)
  2011   – Michael Dummett, English soldier, philosopher, and academic (b. 1925)
  2011   – Helen Frankenthaler, American painter and educator (b. 1928)
  2011   – Johnny Wilson, Canadian-American ice hockey player and coach (b. 1929)
2012 – Harry Carey, Jr., American actor, producer, and screenwriter (b. 1921)
  2012   – Lloyd Charmers, Jamaican singer, keyboard player, and producer (b. 1938)
  2012   – Tingye Li, Chinese-American physicist and engineer (b. 1931)
  2012   – Archie Roy, Scottish astronomer and academic (b. 1924)
  2012   – Norman Schwarzkopf, Jr., American general and engineer (b. 1934)
  2012   – Salt Walther, American race car driver (b. 1947)
2013 – Richard Ambler, English-Scottish biologist and academic (b. 1933)
  2013   – Mohamad Chatah, Lebanese economist and politician, Lebanese Minister of Finance (b. 1951)
  2013   – Gianna D'Angelo, American soprano and educator (b. 1929)
  2013   – John Matheson, Canadian colonel, lawyer, and politician (b. 1917)
  2013   – Farooq Sheikh, Indian actor, philanthropist and a popular television presenter (b. 1948)
2014 – Ben Ammi Ben-Israel, American-Israeli religious leader, founded the African Hebrew Israelites of Jerusalem (b. 1939)
  2014   – Ulises Estrella, Ecuadorian poet and academic (b. 1939)
  2014   – Ronald Li, Hong Kong accountant and businessman (b. 1929)
  2014   – Karel Poma, Belgian bacteriologist and politician (b. 1920)
2015 – Stein Eriksen, Norwegian-American skier (b. 1927)
  2015   – Dave Henderson, American baseball player and sportscaster (b. 1958)
  2015   – Ellsworth Kelly, American painter and sculptor (b. 1923)
  2015   – Meadowlark Lemon, American basketball player and minister (b. 1932)
  2015   – Alfredo Pacheco, Salvadoran footballer (b. 1982)
  2015   – Stevie Wright, English-Australian singer-songwriter (b. 1947) 
2016 – Carrie Fisher, American actress, screenwriter, author, producer, and speaker (b. 1956)
  2016   – Ratnasiri Wickremanayake, Sri Lankan politician (b. 1933)
2018 – Frank Blaichman, Polish resistance fighter (b. 1922)
2019 – Maria Creveling, American League of Legends player (b. 1995)

Holidays and observances
 Christian feast day:
 Blessed Francesco Spoto
 Blessed Sára Salkaházi
 Fabiola
 John the Apostle
 Pope Maximus of Alexandria
 Nicarete
 Theodorus and Theophanes
 December 27 (Eastern Orthodox liturgics)
 Constitution Day (North Korea)
 Emergency Rescuer's Day (Russia)
 St. Stephen's Day (Eastern Orthodox Church; a public holiday in Romania)
 The third of the Twelve Days of Christmas (Western Christianity)

References

External links

 BBC: On This Day
 
 Historical Events on December 27

Days of the year
December